The Philo C. Bailey House is a historic house in Waseca, Minnesota, United States, built in 1868.  From 1872 until his death it was the home of Philo C. Bailey (1828–1907), a notable local pioneer, businessman, politician, and civic leader.  The house was listed on the National Register of Historic Places in 1994 for having local significance in the themes of politics/government and social history.  It was nominated for its association with Bailey, who was involved in a remarkably wide range of activities in the early years of Waseca's development.  The building now houses the research library of the Waseca County Historical Society.

See also
 National Register of Historic Places listings in Waseca County, Minnesota

References

External links

 Waseca County Historical Society

1868 establishments in Minnesota
Buildings and structures in Waseca County, Minnesota
Houses on the National Register of Historic Places in Minnesota
Houses completed in 1868
Italianate architecture in Minnesota
Libraries in Minnesota
National Register of Historic Places in Waseca County, Minnesota